William Catesby may refer to:

 William Catesby (died 1478) , English landowner and MP for Northamptonshire, 1449, 1453
 William Catesby (1450–1485), English landowner and MP for Northamptonshire, 1484
William Catesby, High Sheriff of Warwickshire in 1371
William Catesby (died 1383), MP and father of John Catesby (MP for Warwickshire)